The Cascade mountain wolf (Canis lupus fuscus) is an extinct subspecies of the gray wolf that was once found in the Pacific Northwest (British Columbia, Oregon, and Washington), but became extinct in 1940.

Taxonomy
It was originally identified as a separate species by Richardson in 1839 and from other wolves in the area by Edward Goldman in 1945. It is recognized as a subspecies of Canis lupus in the taxonomic authority Mammal Species of the World (2005).

Description
It was described as a cinnamon-coloured wolf, measuring 165 cm and weighing 36–49 kg.

Resettlement
Recently another subspecies, the British Columbia wolf (Canis lupus columbianus), has established itself in the Cascade mountain wolf's past territory by following the Cascade Range through Washington and is now west of the Cascade Crest, expanding across Oregon, and into northern California to Lassen Peak, where in 2019 the Lassen pack produced 3 pups.

References

Subspecies of Canis lupus
Extinct mammals of North America
Carnivorans of North America
Mammal extinctions since 1500
Extinct animals of the United States
Extinct animals of Canada
Cascade Range
Fauna of the Western United States
Mammals of Canada
Mammals of the United States
Wolves in the United States
Mammals described in 1839

fr:Canis lupus fuscus